Bono State (or Bonoman) was a trading state created by the Bono people, located in what is now southern Ghana. Bonoman was a medieval Akan kingdom in what is now Bono, Bono East and Ahafo region respectively named after the (Bono and Ahafo) and Eastern Ivory Coast. It is generally accepted as the origin of the subgroups of the Akan people who migrated out of the state at various times to create new Akan states in search of gold. The gold trade, which started to boom in Bonoman as early in the 12th century, was the genesis of Akan power and wealth in the region, beginning in the Middle Ages.

Origin
The origin of the Akan people of Bonoman was said to be further north in what is now called the Sahel or the then Ghana Empire when Bono natives wanted to remain with their traditional form of Bono ancestral worship and spirituality, those Akans that disagreed and fought wars against Islam, migrated south of the Sahara, in present-day Ghana.

Trading centers used by state

Bono Mansa 
Bono Mansa [literally "On the state of Bono"]) sometimes known as Bono Manso or Mansu was a trading area in the medieval state of Bonoman, and a major trading centre in what is now predominantly Bono East region. Located just south of the Black Volta river at the transitional zone between savanna and forest, the town was frequented by caravans from Djenné and Timbuktu as part of the Trans-Saharan trade. Goods traded included kola nuts, salt, leather, and gold; gold was the most important trading good of the area, starting in the mid-14th century.

Begho

Begho (also Bighu or Bitu; called Bew and Nsokɔ by the Akan) was a medieval trading town located just south of the Black Volta at the transitional zone between the forest and savanna north-western Brong-Ahafo. The town, like Bono-Manso, was of considerable importance as an entrepot  frequented by northern caravans from Mali Empire from around 1100 AD. Goods traded included ivory, salt, leather, gold, kola nuts, cloth, and copper alloys.

Excavations have laid bare walled structures dated between 1350 and 1750 AD, as well as pottery of all kinds, smoking pipes, and evidence of iron smelting. With a probable population of over 10 000, Begho was one of the largest towns in the southern part of West Africa at the time of the arrival of the Portuguese in 1471.

The Malian king occupied Bighu in the mid-sixteenth century as a "perceived failure of the Bighu Juula to maintain supplies of gold," according to Bakewell. "As a result of the occupation of Bighu it seems clear that the Malian king gained access for a time to that part of the Akan gold trade which the Wangara were able to control." Bakewell also notes, "the site of the abandoned town of Bighu, or Bitu, in the present-day Ghana...lies near the present village of Hani.":18,30–31

Bonduku

Bonduku was another trading center within the empire of Bonoman. It gave birth to the state of Gyaman also spelled Jamang Kingdom which was particularly famous in the production of cotton. The state existed from 1450 to 1895 and was located in what is now Ghana and Côte d'Ivoire.

Structure of towns of Bonoman
Based on excavations, carbon datings and local oral traditions, Effah-Gyamfi (1985) postulated three distinct urban phases. According to him, in the early phase (thirteenth to the fifteenth century) the urban center was relatively small, and the towns were populated by thousands of people, not all living in the urban center. Buildings were made of daubed wattle. Painted pottery of this period was found distributed within a radius of 3.3 km.

In the second phase, the 16th to the 17th century, the urban centers were larger, consisting mainly of evenly distributed houses and a nuclear market center. Many indications of participation in long-distance trade, such as imported glass beads and mica coated pottery, stem from this period.

Fall of the Bonoman
The fall of Bono state occurred during the rise of more Akan nations, especially the exodus of various subgroups of Akans from the Bono state. This is where a majority of Akan dialects of Ivory Coast migrated west of Ghana. Several factors weakened this state, including conflicts among the leadership, conflicts due to taxation, and no direct access to the coast of Gold Coast, where trade was helping many Akan states have more influence.

Influence on Akan Culture 
Various aspects of Akan culture stem from the Bono state, including the umbrella used for the kings, the swords of the nation, the stools, goldsmithing, blacksmithing, Kente Cloth weaving, the infamous adinkra symbols and goldweighing.

References

Further reading

Effah-Gyamfi, Kwaku (1979), Traditional history of the Bono State Legon: Institute of African Studies, University of Ghana.
Meyerowitz, Eva L.R. (1949), "Bono-Mansu, the earliest centre of civilisation in the Gold Coast", Proceedings of the III International West African Conference, 118–120.

Akan
Akan people
History of Ghana
Populated places in the Brong-Ahafo Region
Former populated places in Ghana
Archaeology of Western Africa